This is a list of Italian equipment of the Cold War primarily the Italian Army. Note the main role of the Italian Army in the Cold War period was to protect Southern Europe from an attack from Yugoslavia.

Small arms

Rifles 

 M1 Garand- Used immediately post War till 1959.Was manufactured Italy with American help.
 Beretta BM 59-Italian improved Garand with select fire. 
 Beretta AR70- Modern rifle for its time in 5.56 introduced 1972.

Sidearms 

 Beretta M1934- This weapon had an amazingly long service life in the Italian army only being replaced in 1981.
 Beretta 92S- Adopted in 1981 to replace obsolete M1934. Later variant Beretta M9 similarly replaced the long lived M1911 pistol in US service.

Machine guns 

 MG42/59- Italian made MG 3 machine gun

Submachine guns 

 Franchi LF-57- An extremely small number made for Navy and the  Target Acquisition Group of the 3rd Missile Brigade (GRACO).

Anti-tank weapons 

 Breda Folgore

Artillery

Mountain artillery 

 OTO Melara Mod 56- From Italian company OTO Melara today famous for making naval Weapons and Italian AFV's.

Heavy artillery 

 FH70

Self propelled 

 M44 self-propelled howitzer
 M107 self-propelled gun
 M109 howitzer

Armoured fighting vehicles (AFV's)

Tanks 

 M26 Pershing- used immediately post World War II as frontline tank
 M46 Patton- used temporarily until M47 Patton could be sent
 M47 Patton-Main Italian MBT from 1952 to 1970.
 M60 tank-Replaced M47 saw service till end of Cold War
 Leopard 1- used alongside M60.

APC's 

 M113 armored personnel carrier

References

Cold War weapons by country
Italy